Young Naturists America (YNA) was a New York-based naturist company for young adults. It was founded in 2010 and closed in 2017.

YNA focused mostly on the 21-to-35 age demographic. Company-sponsored activities included nude parties and events at resorts and night clubs.

YNA closed and ended its activities by the end of 2017.

References 

Naturism in the United States
Clothing free organizations
Underground culture